The 2004 SWAC men's basketball tournament was held March 11–13, 2004, at Bill Harris Arena in Birmingham, Alabama.  defeated , 63–58 in the championship game. The Hornets received the conference's automatic bid to the 2004 NCAA tournament as No. 16 seed in the Atlanta Region.

Bracket and results

References

2003–04 Southwestern Athletic Conference men's basketball season
SWAC men's basketball tournament